heute (German for today) is a television news program on the German channel ZDF. The main program is broadcast at 19:00, and includes news, with an emphasis on political news from Germany, Europe and the world, plus 'mixed' news from cultural life or entertainment, and the sports news with an extra presenter. The weather forecast comes up about 19:22 after a break with commercials. For many years, the opening sequence of each broadcast featured an analogue clock, a signature element of the program.  On July 19, 2021; the opening sequence switched to a digital clock along with updated graphics and music, along with a new anchor desk and set.

The newscast heute of ZDF and the 20:00-Tagesschau of Das Erste are the main broadcasts of German public TV starting the evening programme. Advertisements can not be shown on public television in Germany after 8:00 pm.

History
The first heute broadcast took place on 1 April 1963, the day ZDF itself started broadcasting.

heute was originally broadcast from 19:30 to 20:00 CET; on 1 February 1965, the show was split into two parts - heute (19:30 to 19:45 CET) and themen des tages (themes/headlines of the day) (19:45 to 20:00 CET). From 1 January 1969 the themen des tages was dropped so the evening programs could start earlier. In 1971, Wibke Bruhns was the first female presenter.

In 1973, its airtime was moved to 19:00, where it remains today.
In April 1999 heute in Europa or today in Europe was released and only Europe News a shown.
In the year 2000 a new News Show with the name heute - in Deutschland or today - in Germany came up. It shows news only from Germany. It is always 14:00 on ZDF, after the Mittagsmagzin.
Since 2014, the main presenters of the 7pm broadcast have been Petra Gerster and Christian Sievers, who alternate weekly; Barbara Hahlweg acts as a stand-in if neither Gerster or Sievers are available.

Present-day
The main program usually has a length of 20 minutes (including a weather forecast). It is also broadcast on 3sat. Around 21:45 CET, a longer, more in-depth show called heute-journal is broadcast, which is similar to Tagesthemen airing on Das Erste alongside the Tagesschau.

Identity
Since 1973, the program's title music was preceded by the letters h-e-u-t-e in morse code (···· · ··- - ·). In 1998, this was integrated with the title music, and the dots and dashes are no longer distinguishable.

On 17 July 2009, a new virtual studio debuted, featuring redesigned graphics and the integration of the title sequence to the studio in most editions.

From 19 July 2021, the virtual studio got redesigned and at the start of the 7pm broadcast, it shows Germany, Europe, and the world before announcing the title and its presenters.

Presenters
7pm edition

Sports news

References

External links

Official website

ZDF original programming
German television news shows
1963 German television series debuts
1960s German television series
1970s German television series
1980s German television series
1990s German television series
2000s German television series
2010s German television series
German-language television shows
German news websites